Medical Devices Park, Hyderabad is a medical devices industrial estate located in Hyderabad, Telangana, India. The largest such Park in India spread over 250 acres. The dedicated park's ecosystem supports medical technology innovation and manufacturing.

History
The Park was inaugurated on 17 June 2017 near Hyderabad at Sultanpur in Patancheru of Sangareddy district by the Minister for Industries, K. T. Rama Rao.

References

2017 establishments in Telangana
Economy of Hyderabad, India
Economy of Telangana
Industries in Hyderabad, India
Industrial parks in India
Science parks in India
Research institutes in Hyderabad, India
High-technology business districts in India
Biotechnology